Maciste and the Chinese Chest is a 1923 German silent action film directed by Carl Boese and starring Bartolomeo Pagano, Rudolf Lettinger, and Jakob Tiedtke. It was one of several German films featuring the Italian peplum hero Maciste.

The film's sets were designed by the art director Fritz Kraenke and Willy Reiber.

Cast

References

Bibliography

External links

1923 films
Films of the Weimar Republic
German silent feature films
Films directed by Carl Boese
German black-and-white films
1920s action films
German action films
Maciste films
Silent adventure films
1920s German films